Müslüm Gürses (7 May 1953 – 3 March 2013), born Müslüm Akbaş and called Müslüm Baba (literally: Father Müslüm), was a popular Turkish arabesque singer and actor.

Personal life
He was born on 7 May 1953 in an adobe hut in the Turkmen village of Fıstıközü in Halfeti district of Şanlıurfa Province, southeastern Turkey. His mother was Emine, his father Mehmet, a farmer. Müslüm was only three years old when the family migrated to Adana due to financial problems.

At the age of 13, Müslüm was singing in the cotton fields he was working in. In his childhood, he also worked as a tailor's and a cobbler's apprentice. In 1967, he participated and won the title of a song contest organized by Adana Family-friendly Tea Garden. He then began to perform at Radio Çukurova. During this time, he adopted the surname Gürses, which means literally "stentorian voice".

In 1978, during a trip from Tarsus, Mersin to Adana, he was involved in a car accident. The crash scene was so terrible that he was assumed dead as he was pulled off the wreck, and therefore taken to the morgue instead of the hospital. After discovered by chance that he was alive, he was treated and underwent cranioplasty, getting a metal plate implemented for skull repair.

Another tragedy he experienced was that in addition to his brother's murder, his father murdered his mother. Mehmet Akbaş remarried after he was released from prison. However, Müslüm Gürses remained all the time silent and resentful because of his father's doing.

In 1980, Müslüm Gürses was on a concert tour in Malatya, where Muhterem Nur (1932–2020) already a well-known movie actress and singer, shared the stage with him. They started a quarrel during the evening. This became the beginning of the ever-lasting love between the two. The couple got married following after four years in 1986. He was her second husband.

Career
From 1967 on, he performed live türkü, Turkish folk songs, regularly on Saturdays within the state-owned radio station of TRT Adana-Çukurova. His debut record single "Emmioğlu/Ovada Taşa Basma" was released in 1968. The next year in 1969, he already landed a hit record titled "Sevda Yüklü Kervanlar/Vurma Güzel Vurma" released by Palandöken Records in Istanbul, which sold 300,000 copies.

After completing his conscription, he returned to Istanbul and successfully continued to record folk songs. He had 13 singles by label Palandöken, four by Bestefon, 15 by Hülya Records and finally two by Çin Çin Records. Müslüm Gürses stepped into Yeşilçam in the heyday of fanciful arabesque music, and starred in 38 movies singing songs in most of them.

Later in his life, Gürses's interest started to shift toward other musical genres. He included pop and rock music to his repertory, singing such titles as "Olmadı Yar" of Nilüfer, "Paramparça" of Teoman and "İkimizin Yerine" of Tarkan.

Müslüm Gürses mainly sang Turkish folk and Ottoman classical music in arabesque style. In his songs, he primarily expressed sorrow and painful feelings. He is considered a cult figure of Turkish folk music, and has a very dedicated group of fans, most of whom being young, low-income urban people, who call him "Müslüm Baba'" ("Papa Müslüm") affectionately.

Gürses had maybe the most interesting audience. At a time, his fans used to cut and bleed themselves using razor blades during his concerts. This phenomenon led to Müslüm Gürses becoming a subject of scientific research at universities. For this reason, even intellectuals began to take an interest in him during the late 1990s.

Health complications and death
In November 2012, it was announced that Gürses was in critical condition following a heart bypass surgery he had undergone recently. On 3 March 2013 at 10:30, he died due to complications with his surgery and declining health during post-operative care. He had been in the intensive care unit continuously since his surgery. After a memorial ceremony held at the Cemal Reşit Rey Concert Hall the next day and subsequent religious funeral in the Teşvikiye Mosque, he was buried at the Zincirlikuyu Cemetery.

Works

Filmography
 Sappur Suppur – 2006
 Bomba Bomba – 2008
 Bas Gaza – 2009
 Haydi Bastir – 2010
 Psikopal – 2012
 Metropol – 2014
 Kiyamet – 2016
 Tansiyon – 2018
 Oha – 2020
 Askina Menmu – 2021
 Karisik – 2022

Composer
 Ağır abi (2011)
 Yaşlı Gözlerin Üstadı – Kul (2013)

References

External links
 
 
 Müslüm Gürses on Spotify

1953 births
2013 deaths
People from Halfeti
Turkish male film actors
Burials at Zincirlikuyu Cemetery
20th-century Turkish male actors
21st-century Turkish male actors
20th-century Turkish male singers
Turkish folk-pop singers
Golden Butterfly Award winners